Sega Smash Pack (Sega Archives from USA in Japan) is a series of game compilations featuring mostly Sega Genesis games.

Pack 1 (Windows) 
The first pack titled Sega Smash Pack (Sega Archives from USA Vol. 1 in Japan) featured eight games.

Altered Beast 
Columns 
Golden Axe 
Out Run 
Phantasy Star II
Sonic Spinball
The Revenge of Shinobi
Vectorman

Pack 2 (Windows)
The second pack titled Sega Puzzle Pack (Sega Archives from USA Vol. 2 in Japan) featured three games.

 Columns III
 Dr. Robotnik's Mean Bean Machine
 Lose Your Marbles

Pack 3 (Windows)
The third pack titled Sega Smash Pack 2 (Sega Archives from USA Vol. 3 in Japan) featured eight games.

Comix Zone
Flicky 
Kid Chameleon
Sega Swirl
Shining Force
Sonic the Hedgehog 2 
Super Hang-On 
Vectorman 2

Console (Dreamcast)
The console version of Sega Smash Pack was released for Dreamcast titled Sega Smash Pack Volume 1 and featured the following twelve games:

Altered Beast 
Columns 
Golden Axe
Phantasy Star II
The Revenge of Shinobi
Sega Swirl
Shining Force
Sonic the Hedgehog
Streets of Rage 2
Vectorman
Virtua Cop 2
Wrestle War

Jeff Gerstmann from GameSpot gave the console version a 4.5/10. He criticised the console version for its patchy performance and poorly emulated music.

The Genesis emulator built inside the compilation gained popularity with homebrew groups, as Echelon released a kit that allowed users to add and load their own Genesis ROMs. Gary Lake, the programmer, had himself deliberately left a documentation of the built-in emulator, with the documentation seemingly intended at them due to the filename (ECHELON.TXT). Additionally, Sega Swirl and Virtua Cop 2 were the only non-Genesis games in the compilation.

Handheld (Game Boy Advance)
The handheld version of Sega Smash Pack was released for Game Boy Advance simply titled Sega Smash Pack and featured three games, two of which had been included in the first Smash Pack. While Ecco the Dolphin and Sonic Spinball were developed using the original source code, Golden Axe had to be recreated from scratch.

Ecco the Dolphin
Golden Axe 
Sonic Spinball

Craig Harris from IGN gave the handheld version a 6/10. He criticised the handheld version for several technical issues and lack of cooperative multiplayer in Golden Axe. It was nominated for GameSpots annual "Most Disappointing Game on Game Boy Advance" award, which went to The Revenge of Shinobi.

References

1999 video games
Dreamcast games
Game Boy Advance games
Sega Games franchises
Sega video game compilations
THQ games
Windows games